The 2016 season is Club Atlético River Plate's 5th consecutive season in the top-flight of Argentine football. The season covers the period from 1 January 2016 to 30 June 2016.

Season events
On February 3, Andrés D'Alessandro signed with River Plate on a one-year loan. It was his return after 13 years to the club in which he was formed and had made his first professional appearance in 2000.

On February 15, River Plate introduced its new home kit for the 2016 season.

On February 25, the team made its debut at the 2016 Copa Libertadores with a 4-0 away win against Trujillanos.

On March 10, River Plate introduced the official away kit for the season. The model was inspired on the one that the club wore on the 1985/86 League, commemorating the 30th anniversary of that tournament won by the club.

On April 5, River Plate introduced an alternative orange uniform, commemorating the 30th anniversary of a 2-0 win against Boca Juniors at La Bombonera, when the team did an olympic turn at the rival's stadium after winning the 1985/86 League. In that match, an orange ball was used due to the white confetti in the field, which made the regular white ball difficult to be seen.

On May 4, River Plate was eliminated from the Copa Libertadores on the Round of 16 despite its 1-0 win at home over Independiente del Valle.

Squad Summer

Transfers

In

Out

Loan In

Loan Out

Friendlies

Pre-season

Mid-season

Primera División

League table

Copa Libertadores

References

Club Atlético River Plate seasons
River Plate